N68 may refer to:

Roads 
 Andaya Highway, in the Philippines
 N68 road (Ireland)
 Nebraska Highway 68, in the United States

Other uses 
 Escadrille N.68, a unit of the French Air Force
 Franklin County Regional Airport, in Pennsylvania, United States
 , a submarine of the Royal Navy
 London Buses route N68